Trono ("throne" in Italian, Spanish and Portuguese) may refer to:

Diante do Trono, Brazilian gospel band
El Trono de Mexico, Duranguense band formed in Mexico in 2004
Giuseppe Trono (1739–1810), Italian painter
Il Trono dei Ricordi, Italian Progressive rock band of the 1990s
Il trono e la seggiola, 1918 Italian film directed by Augusto Genina
Julian Marcus Trono (born 1997), Filipino child actor and television personality
Robert E. Trono, the Deputy Director of the United States Marshals Service
Trono de Gracia con Don Moen, album of Christian worship music recorded by Don Moen